Kunle Martins is an American artist. He was born in 1980 in New York, where he currently lives and works.

Solo exhibitions 
Martins presented What’s Up Fam? at 56 HENRY in early 2020, 1 and Portraits: Looking Like a Snack at Shoot the Lobster in New York in early 2019.

Group exhibitions 
In spring 2019 Martins collaborated with contemporary artist and romantic partner Jack Pierson on the exhibition Pee Party at Jeffrey Stark in New York. Martins's work has appeared in other group shows at galleries and cultural institutions throughout the United States and Europe, including The Hole, New York; Beyond the Streets, New York; White Columns Benefit Auction, New York; Amelchenko, New York; Bonnie Poon, Paris; Coney Art Walls, New York; Wynwood Walls, Miami; Museum of Contemporary Art, Los Angeles; and Clayton Patterson Gallery, New York.

Personal life
Martins identifies as gay.

References

American portrait artists
Living people
1980 births
Artists from New York (state)
American gay artists